Avulsion in general refers to a tearing away. Specifically, it can refer to: 

 Avulsion fracture, when a fragment of bone tears away from the main mass of bone as a result of physical trauma
 Avulsion injury, in which a body structure is detached from its normal point of insertion, either torn away by trauma or cut by surgery
 Avulsion (legal term), the sudden loss of land by the action of water
 Avulsion (river), abandonment of an old river channel and the creation of a new one